Southcott is a hamlet west of Great Torrington in the parish of Frithelstock in the district of Torridge, Devon, England.

References

External links 

Hamlets in Devon
Torridge District